Major General Frederick Augustus Irving (September 3, 1894 – September 12, 1995) was a United States Army officer who served in both World War I and World War II and was superintendent of the United States Military Academy from 1951 to 1954 and eventually lived to the age of 101.

Military career

Irving was born in Massachusetts on September 3, 1894. He entered the United States Military Academy (USMA) at West Point, New York in June 1913, from where he graduated on April 20, 1917, exactly two weeks after the American entry into World War I, as a second lieutenant of Infantry. He was promoted to first lieutenant on May 15, 1917, and to temporary captain on August 5. During the war he saw action in France in the St. Mihiel offensive in September 1918. He was a company commander with the 15th Machine Gun Battalion, part of the 5th Division of the American Expeditionary Forces (AEF). He was wounded during the battle and subsequently received the Silver Star for "leading his company through heavy artillery and machine gun fire."

Irving was also active during the interwar period, during which he attended the United States Army Command and General Staff College, and in World War II, leading the 24th Infantry Division during the invasions of Hollandia, New Guinea and Leyte in the Philippines, before being suddenly removed from his command in late 1944 and replaced by Major General Roscoe B. Woodruff. He was commandant of cadets at West Point from 1941 to 1942.

Irving's service in the American military extended thirty-seven years, and he retired from service in 1954. He died in 1995 of congestive heart failure at Mount Vernon Hospital in Alexandria, Virginia. He was 101.

References

External links

Generals of World War II

|-

1894 births
1995 deaths
United States Army Command and General Staff College alumni
Military personnel from Massachusetts
United States Military Academy alumni
Superintendents of the United States Military Academy
Commandants of the Corps of Cadets of the United States Military Academy
United States Army personnel of World War I
American centenarians
Men centenarians
Recipients of the Silver Star
Recipients of the Legion of Merit
United States Army generals of World War II
United States Army generals
20th-century American academics